The 1965–66 season was Manchester United's 64th season in the Football League, and their 21st consecutive season in the top division of English football.

As defending champions of the First Division title, they finished fourth and secured qualification for the Inter-Cities Fairs Cup. They lost to eventual winners Everton in the FA Cup semifinal.

In the European Cup, they were also semi-finalists, edged out by Yugoslav champions Partizan Belgrade. They had to negotiate a preliminary round of the competition before qualifying for the first round, and did so by achieving a 9–2 aggregate win over Finnish champions HJK Helsinki.

United's top scorer for this season was David Herd, with 24 league goals and 33 in all competitions.

FA Charity Shield

First Division

FA Cup

European Cup

Squad statistics

References

Manchester United F.C. seasons
Manchester United